Bekassy, Békási, Békásy or Békássy is a Hungarian surname. Notable people with the surname include: 

Ferenc Békássy (1893–1915), Hungarian poet
Stephen Bekassy (1907–1995), Hungarian-born American actor

Hungarian-language surnames